Tello is a Galician surname, and means tile. Notable people with the surname include:

 Andrés Tello (born 1996), Colombian footballer who plays as a midfielder
Claudio Tello (1963–2014), Chilean footballer 
 Cristian Tello (born 1991), Spanish footballer who plays as a forward/winger
 Rodrigo Tello (born 1979), Chilean footballer who plays as a midfielder
 Manuel Diego Tello (born 1984), Spanish footballer who plays as a midfielder
 Sebastian Castro-Tello (born 1987), Swedish footballer who plays as a midfielder/striker
 Gary Tello (born 1993), Chilean footballer who plays as a left-back
 Edier Tello (born 1990), Colombian footballer who plays as a forward
 Julio César Tello (1880–1947), Peruvian archaeologist
 Manuel Tello Baurraud (1898–1971), Mexican diplomat
 José Eugenio Tello (1849–1924), Argentine politician
 Carlos Tello Macías (born 1938), Mexican economist
 Fernando Gutiérrez Tello, Spanish noble
 Steve Tello (born 1950), television executive